Raiganj subdivision is an administrative subdivision of the Uttar Dinajpur district in the Indian state of West Bengal.

Subdivisions
Uttar Dinajpur district is divided into two administrative subdivisions:

Administrative units
Raiganj subdivision has 4 police stations, 4 community development blocks, 4 panchayat samitis, 39 gram panchayats, 747 mouzas, 745 inhabited villages, 2 municipalities and 3 census towns. The municipalities are at Raiganj and Kaliaganj. The census towns are: Nachhratpur Katabari, Kasba and Itahar. The subdivision has its headquarters at Raiganj.

Police stations
Police stations in Raiganj subdivision have the following features and jurisdiction:

Blocks
Community development blocks in Raiganj subdivision are:

Gram panchayats
The subdivision contains 39 gram panchayats under 4 community development blocks:

 Hemtabad block: Rural area consists of five gram panchayats, viz. Bangalbari, Chainagar, Naoda, Bishnupur and Hemtabad.
 Itahar block: Rural area consists of 12 gram panchayats, viz. Chhayghara, Gulandar–I, Joyhat, Patirajpur, Durgapur, Gulandar–II, Kapasia, Surun–I, Durlovpur, Itahar, Marnai and Surun–II.
 Kaliaganj block: Rural area consists of eight gram panchayats, viz. Anantapur, Bhandar, Dhankoil, Mustafanagar, Baruna, Bochadanga, Malgaon and Radhikapur.
 Raiganj block: Rural area consists of 14 gram panchayats, viz. Bahin, Gouri, Mahipur, Sitgram, Barua, Jagadishpur, Maraikura, Bhatun, Bindole, Kamalabari–I, Rampur Maharajahat, Birghoi, Kamalabari–II and Serpur.

Education
Uttar Dinajpur district had a literacy rate of 59.07% (for population of 7 years and above) as per the census of India 2011. Raiganj subdivision had a literacy rate of 66.94%, Islampur subdivision 52.40%.

Given in the table below (data in numbers) is a comprehensive picture of the education scenario in Uttar Dinajpur district for the year 2012-13:

Note: Primary schools include junior basic schools; middle schools, high schools and higher secondary schools include madrasahs; technical schools include junior technical schools, junior government polytechnics, industrial technical institutes, industrial training centres, nursing training institutes etc.; technical and professional colleges include engineering colleges, medical colleges, para-medical institutes, management colleges, teachers training and nursing training colleges, law colleges, art colleges, music colleges etc. Special and non-formal education centres include sishu siksha kendras, madhyamik siksha kendras, centres of Rabindra mukta vidyalaya, recognised Sanskrit tols, institutions for the blind and other handicapped persons, Anganwadi centres, reformatory schools etc.

The following institutions are located in Raiganj subdivision:
Raiganj University came into being in 2015, with the upgradation of Raiganj College (University College), which was initially set up in 1948 as Raiganj College.
Raiganj Government Medical College and Hospital was established in 2018, incorporating the District Hospital.
Raiganj Surendranath Mahavidyalaya was established in 1986.
Kaliyaganj College was established in 1968 at Kaliaganj.
Dr. Meghnad Saha College was established in 2000 at Village: Ranipur, PO Tilna, PS Itahar.
Raiganj Polytechnic was established in 1986.
Raiganj B.ED. College was established in 1981.
Netaji Subhas Ch. Bose Teachers Training College was established at Village: Ratanpur, PO Bindole, PS Raiganj.
Moulana Abul Kalam Azad B.Ed. College was established in 2005 at Village: Bagbari, PO Itahar.

Healthcare
The table below (all data in numbers) presents an overview of the medical facilities available and patients treated in the hospitals, health centres and sub-centres in 2013 in Uttar Dinajpur district.  
 

.* Excluding nursing homes

Medical facilities available in Raiganj subdivision are as follows:

Hospitals: (Name, location, beds)
Raiganj District Hospital, Raiganj, 300 beds
Kasba Police Hospital, PO Debipur, Raiganj, 50 beds
Kaliaganj State General Hospital, Kaliaganj, 60 beds
Rural Hospitals: (Name, CD block, location, beds)
Itahar Rural Hospital, Itahar CD block, Itahar, 30 beds
Hemtabad Rural Hospital, Hemtabad CD block, Uttar Dinajpur, 30 beds
Block Primary Health Centre: (Name, block, location, beds)
Rampur BPHC, Raiganj CD block, Rampur, 10 beds
Kunour BPHC, Kaliaganj CD block, Kunour, 10 beds
Primary Health Centres: (CD Block-wise)(CD block, PHC location, beds)
Raiganj CD block: PO Bhupalpur (Durgapur PHC) (6), PO Bhupalpur (Bindol PHC) (6), PO Bholahat (Bhatun PHC) (10)
Itahar CD block: Marani (10),  Churaman (6), Paraharipur (Surun PHC) (6)
Kaliaganj CD block: Majhiar (6)
Hemtabad CD block: Bangalbari (10), Baharail (6)

Electoral constituencies
Lok Sabha (parliamentary) and Vidhan Sabha (state assembly) constituencies in Raiganj subdivision were as follows:

References

External links
 

Subdivisions of West Bengal
Subdivisions in Uttar Dinajpur district
Uttar Dinajpur district